Gilbert Plains station is a flag stop located in Gilbert Plains, Manitoba, Canada.  The station is served by Via Rail's Winnipeg – Churchill train.

Footnotes

External links 
Via Rail Station Information

Via Rail stations in Manitoba